Pseudolusitanops bulbiformis is an extinct species of sea snail, a marine gastropod mollusc in the family Raphitomidae.

Description
More commonly known as the Lusitanops, the Pseudolusitanops bulbiformis was accepted as a species in the late 1900s. The only form of this creature remaining is fossils.  The length of the shell attains 5.6 mm.

Distribution
Fossils of this extinct marine species were found in Oligocene strata in Aquitaine, France.

References

 Lozouet P. (1999). Nouvelles espèces de gastéropodes (Mollusca: Gastropoda) de l'Oligocène et du Miocène inférieur d'Aquitaine (sud-ouest de la France). Partie 2. Cossmanniana. 6: 1-68.
 Lozouet (P.), 2017 Les Conoidea de l’Oligocène supérieur (Chattien) du bassin de l’Adour (Sud-Ouest de la France). Cossmanniana, t. 19, p. 1-179

bulbiformis
Gastropods described in 1999